Wahlstorf is a village and a former municipality  in the Ludwigslust-Parchim district, in Mecklenburg-Vorpommern, Germany. Since 1 January 2014, it has been part of the municipality Gehlsbach.

References

Former municipalities in Mecklenburg-Western Pomerania